Amistad Onus (Translated from the Latin to: "Alliance Load" or "Friend Load") is the Latin name of a Tax that was famously first implemented by the Milesian school. The practice was quickly spread as students of the Milesian school became scholars themselves, and by 318 BC it was a common practice amongst many Greek schools and tutors.

Original application of Tax
Originally this was a burden placed on the students of a scholar or institution to provide sufficient resources to support the teachers in moderate comfort. The name comes from the fact that this duty was spread amongst the students.

Later application of Tax
The practice of Amistad Onus spread as scholars influenced by the Milesian school started using it themselves - where it became picked up in particular by early medical institutions/schools.

The Tax's meaning and definition was eventually changed when the Hippocratic Oath became widely undertaken by Ancient Greek medicine schools.

The Tax became a way of ensuring the school's prosperity after a student graduated by forcing them to send all their payments to the school first where the school would take a 17% cut of the wage derived, in exchange for their name to be advertised, as well as to pay for an annually renewed writ/license which gave the practitioner the right to practice their craft as a representative of the school, giving a guarantee of quality of service and thus improving their ability to gain wealthy clients.

The Tax also helped to uphold the honor and reputation of the institution that taught them, as practitioners could be essentially cut off financially by the institution if they failed to pay their wages to the university first. However, after the establishment of the Roman Empire as the main continental power in Europe the Greek schools fell into decline and with them the practice of the Tax.

Modern application of Tax
Since then the Tax has resurfaced and taken on a new translation: Friendship Tax. It is now used by Medical Students at Imperial College London. The Tax states that Medic Friends - because of their common poverty from 6 years of University fees to be paid - must give regular gifts to one another, thus making the course more enjoyable.

Gifts can take on many forms such as foods (e.g. large amounts of Cake or Cookies), but can also be in the form of helping out with chores or work that are otherwise difficult for students to successfully complete by themselves.

The Tax is taken more seriously by older year Medical Students at Imperial as it helps develop a close bond with their peers. It also develops their skills needed for independent living, encourages a spirit of teamwork which is very vital for successful doctors and it also significantly reduces the stress and workload of the studies. As a result, the Medical School faculty at Imperial Medical School is not against the practicing of the so-called Friendship Tax.

Due to its popularity it has become a running joke and practice at many medical schools - not just Imperial.

References
 Bakalis, Nikolaos (2005). Handbook of Greek Philosophy: From Thales to the Stoics Analysis and Fragments, Trafford Publishing 
 William Keith Chambers Guthrie, A History of Greek Philosophy: Volume 1, The Earlier Presocratics and the Pythagoreans, 1962.
 Annas, Julia Classical Greek Philosophy. In Boardman, John; Griffin, Jasper; Murray, Oswyn (ed.) The Oxford History of the Classical World. Oxford University Press: New York, 1986. 
 Longrigg, James Greek Rational Medicine: Philosophy and Medicine from Alcmæon to the Alexandrians, Routledge, 1993.

Ancient Greek culture
Education in classical antiquity